The Canadian province of Quebec held municipal elections in its municipalities on November 6, 2005.

The municipalities in Quebec for the 2005 election were different from the previous 2001 election, as many municipalities had voted to de-amalgamate.

Every municipality in Quebec held elections except Port-Cartier, Thetford Mines, Sept-Îles and in the village and parish of Saint-Georges-de-Cacouna (they were held in 2006).

In addition to the municipalities, the prefects of 8 regional county municipalities were elected:

Kamouraska
La Haute-Gaspésie
La Vallée-de-la-Gatineau
Le Granit
Le Haut-Saint-François
Les Basques
Les Pays-d'en-Haut
Témiscouata

Selected results of the November 6 elections are as follows

Bécancour

Pierre Duplessis is a farmer and former town councillor in Bécancour and a founding president of the Godefroy market. During his mayoral campaign, he accused the Richard administration of lacking transparency.

|-
| align="left" | Alain Levesque
| align="right" | 2,362
| align="right" | 57.67
|-
| align="left" | Christian Richard
| align="right" | 1,380
| align="right" | 33.69
|-
| align="left" | Blak D. Blackburn
| align="right" | 354
| align="right" | 8.64
|-
! align="centre" | Total valid votes
! align="right" | 4,096
! align="right" | 100
|}

Blainville

Boucherville

Brossard

Châteauguay

Dollard-des-Ormeaux

Drummondville

Gatineau

Granby

Laval

Lévis

Longueuil

Montreal

Nicolet
Council
Hélène Langis was elected as the councillor for Nicolet's sixth ward. She later resigned, and a by-election was held to choose her replacement on December 17, 2006:

Québec

Repentigny

Rimouski

Rouyn-Noranda

Saguenay

Saint-Eustache

Saint-Hyacinthe

Saint-Jean-sur-Richelieu

Saint-Jérôme

Salaberry-de-Valleyfield

Shawinigan

Sherbrooke

Terrebonne

Trois-Rivières

Victoriaville

All results by region 
 Quebec municipal elections, 2005, results in Abitibi-Témiscamingue
 Quebec municipal elections, 2005, results in Bas-Saint-Laurent
 Quebec municipal elections, 2005, results in Capitale-Nationale
 Quebec municipal elections, 2005, results in Centre-du-Québec
 Quebec municipal elections, 2005, results in Chaudière-Appalaches
 Quebec municipal elections, 2005, results in Côte-Nord
 Quebec municipal elections, 2005, results in Estrie
 Quebec municipal elections, 2005, results in Gaspésie-Îles-de-la-Madeleine
 Quebec municipal elections, 2005, results in Lanaudière
 Quebec municipal elections, 2005, results in Laurentides
 Quebec municipal elections, 2005, results in Laval
 Quebec municipal elections, 2005, results in Mauricie
 Quebec municipal elections, 2005, results in Montréal
 Quebec municipal elections, 2005, results in Montérégie
 Quebec municipal elections, 2005, results in Nord-du-Québec
 Quebec municipal elections, 2005, results in Outaouais
 Quebec municipal elections, 2005, results in Saguenay-Lac-Saint-Jean

See also
Municipal elections in Canada
Electronic voting in Canada
2006 Quebec municipal elections

References

Sources
MAMR
PG Elections

 
2005
November 2005 events in Canada